Sharaf al-Din Rami Tabrizi, best simply known as Rami Tabrizi, was a 14th-century Persian rhetorician and poet.

References

14th-century Persian-language poets
Rhetoricians
Jalayirid-period poets